Strange Frontier is the second album by the English musician Roger Taylor. This album includes two covers as well as a heavier sound than the previous album. Although Taylor again played most of the instruments himself (drums, guitars, bass and keyboards) and did most of the vocals, there were some occasional cameos from producer David Richards (on synths and piano), Status Quo member Rick Parfitt (on rhythm guitar) and Queen bandmates John Deacon (on bass and mixing), Brian May (rhythm guitar on "Man on Fire") and Freddie Mercury, (who provided backing vocals on "Killing Time"). The US edition has the track order rearranged.

Multiple musical elements from the song "I Cry for You (Love, Hope and Confusion)" (the drum machine, harmonies, chord progressions and overall arrangement) had already been used for the Queen hit song "Radio Ga Ga", released earlier the same year.

Track listing

Personnel
Roger Taylor - vocals, drums, keyboards, bass guitar, guitars
David Richards - keyboards
Freddie Mercury - backing vocals on "Killing Time"
Rick Parfitt - guitar & backing vocals on "It's an Illusion"
John Deacon - bass guitar on "It's an Illusion"
Brian May   - rhythm guitar on "Man On Fire"

Singles
 "Man On Fire"
A-Side: "Man On Fire"  B-Side: "Killing Time"  Released on 4 June 1984.  Reached #66 in the UK Singles Chart.  Released in the UK, Japan, USA, Canada, Germany, France, Spain, Portugal, Australia and South Africa.
 "Strange Frontier"
A-Side: "Strange Frontier"  B-Side: "I Cry For You"  Released on 30 July 1984.  Reached #98 in the UK Singles Chart.  Released in the UK, USA, Canada and The Netherlands.
 "Beautiful Dreams"
A-Side: "Beautiful Dreams"  B-Side: "Young Love"  Released in August 1984.  Only released in Portugal.

References

Roger Taylor (Queen drummer) albums
1984 albums
Albums produced by David Richards (record producer)
Albums produced by Reinhold Mack
Albums produced by Roger Taylor (Queen drummer)
Parlophone albums
EMI Records albums